Fancy Hill is a historic home located near Glasgow, Rockbridge County, Virginia, United States. The house was built in two phases, the first about 1821 and the second about 1831. The result is a two-story, eight-bay, Federal-style brick dwelling.  Front and back two-story porches and two small rooms at the back of the house were added circa the 1840s.  A 1½-story brick wing was added in 1936, when the house was renovated and back porch enclosed.  The property also includes the contributing large gabled two-story barn, equipment garage, and small shed.

It was listed on the National Register of Historic Places in 1997.

The home previously hosted a small Santa Claus museum that was toured during the winter holiday season, and is now privately owned by the Vaughn Family.

References

Houses on the National Register of Historic Places in Virginia
Federal architecture in Virginia
Houses completed in 1821
Houses in Rockbridge County, Virginia
National Register of Historic Places in Rockbridge County, Virginia
U.S. Route 11